Tang-e Gharu, also known as Tang-e Gharo (Pashto: تنگ غارو), is a gorge and a mountain pass in the Hindu Kush mountain range of Kabul Province, Afghanistan. The Kabul River passes through the gorge, flowing eastward. The Kabul–Jalalabad Road runs through the gorge, parallel to the river. Construction on the road began in the 1940s and was completed in the 1960s replacing the ancient Lataband Pass mountain pass. Both the pass and the road are considered to be of major strategic importance, as they provide a connection to Pakistan and Russia. Due to heavy usage during recent conflicts in Afghanistan and frequent traffic accidents, the pass and the surrounding areas have become heavily damaged and periodically closed off.

Geology 
The cliffs of Tang-e Gharu gorge are a blue-grey limestone, which was formed some 250 million years ago. However, the gorge itself is only about 2 million years old and was formed as a combination of water erosion from the river and the collapse of an underground river channel.

References 

Mountain passes of the Hindu Kush
Afghanistan–Soviet Union relations
Pakistan–Soviet Union relations